Paolo (founded 1999) is a private American corporation that owns and operates shoes and accessory retail stores in California and sells worldwide over their internet site. Paolo works under three different labels, Paolo Shoes, Platinum Design Group, and Duke et Duchess.

History
Paolo Shoes was founded in San Francisco, California opening its first freestanding store in November 1999. All Shoes are designed by founder Paolo Iantorno and hand crafted by shoe artisans from northern to southern Italy. Each pair are handmade using skins of exotic nature, leathers and soles used for production have all been certified by C.I.T.E.S.

References

External links
 Paoloshoes.com

Shoe companies of the United States
Retail companies based in California
Companies based in San Francisco
Clothing companies established in 1999
Retail companies established in 1999
1999 establishments in California